Kamenice is a market town in Jihlava District in the Vysočina Region of the Czech Republic. It has about 2,000 inhabitants.

Administrative parts
Villages of Kamenička, Řehořov and Vržanov are administrative parts of Kamenice.

Notable people
Franz Krommer (1759–1831), composer

References

Populated places in Jihlava District
Market towns in the Czech Republic